Devena is a genus of moths of the family Erebidae. the genus was erected by Francis Walker in 1858.

Species
Devena atomifera Walker, 1857
Devena strigania Hampson, 1926

References

Calpinae